Gah may refer to:
Gah, Iran, a village in Razavi Khorasan Province
Gah, Pakistan, a village in Chakwal District
Gāh, a period of time in Zoroastrianism
the ISO 639-3 code for the Alekano language, also known as Gahuku, spoken in the Eastern Highlands Province of Papua New Guinea
Gayndah Airport, IATA code
Guanine deaminase, an enzyme